Leyser is a surname. Notable people with the surname include:

Polykarp Leyser (disambiguation), multiple people
Ottoline Leyser (born 1965), British plant biologist
Henrietta Leyser (born 1941), English historian
Karl Leyser (1920–1992), German-born British historian, husband of Henrietta and father of Ottoline